Jászapáti is a district in north-western part of Jász-Nagykun-Szolnok County. Jászapáti is also the name of the town where the district seat is found. The district is located in the Northern Great Plain Statistical Region. This district is a part of Jászság historical, ethnographical and geographical region.

Geography 
Jászapáti District borders with Heves District (Heves County) to the northeast, Szolnok District to the east and south, Jászberény District to the west. The number of the inhabited places in Jászapáti District is 9.

History 
The Jászapáti District existed before the cessation of the districts in 1983, known as the Lower Jászság District since the 1950s. It was headquartered in Jászapáti and was closed in 1961, when its territory was divided between mainly Jászberény and Szolnok Districts.

Municipalities 
The district has 2 towns, 1 large village and 6 villages.
(ordered by population, as of 1 January 2012)

The bolded municipalities are cities, italics municipality is large village.

Demographics

In 2011, it had a population of 33,172 and the population density was 61/km².

Ethnicity
Besides the Hungarian majority, the main minorities are the Roma (approx. 3,000) and German (100).

Total population (2011 census): 33,172
Ethnic groups (2011 census): Identified themselves: 32,580 persons:
Hungarians: 29,293 (89.12%)
Gypsies: 3,142 (9.64%)
Others and indefinable: 145 (0.45%)
Approx. 500 persons in Jászapáti District did not declare their ethnic group at the 2011 census.

Religion
Religious adherence in the county according to 2011 census:

Catholic – 19,433 (Roman Catholic – 19,370; Greek Catholic – 61);
Reformed – 1,751; 
Evangelical – 56; 
other religions – 472; 
Non-religious – 3,807; 
Atheism – 153;
Undeclared – 7,500.

Transport

Road network
Main road  (W→E): Budapest... – Jászapáti District (1 municipality: Jászapáti) – ...Dormánd 
Main road  (NW→SE):  Hatvan... – Jászapáti District (2 municipalities: Alattyán, Jászalsószentgyörgy) – ...Szolnok

Railway network
Line 86 (N→S): Vámosgyörk (80, 85)... – Jászapáti District (4 municipalities: Jászdózsa, Jászapáti, Jászkisér, Jászladány) – ...Újszász (82, 120)

Gallery

See also
List of cities and towns of Hungary

References

External links
Jászapáti District - HunMix.hu
Postal codes of the Jászapáti District

Districts in Jász-Nagykun-Szolnok County